Virodaya Cinkaiariyan was the Aryacakravarti king of the Jaffna Kingdom in modern-day northern Sri Lanka. Tamil historical writer C. Rasanayagam calculated Virodaya Cinkaiariyan's reign was from 1371 to 1394 while Swamy Gnanapirakasar calculated from 1344 to 1380. During his reign, Vanniar incited Sinhalese for rebellion, which resulted suppression of rebellion, Virodaya’ innovation against Vanniar and they suffered.

Notes

References
 C. Rasanayagam, Ancient Jaffna, Asian Educational Service, New Delhi, 1993. (First edition: Colombo, 1926)

External links
 Yalpana Vaipava Malai

Kings of Jaffna
Sri Lankan Hindus
Sri Lankan Tamil royalty